For over 40 years the discography of The Pretenders, a London, England-based rock band, reflects worldwide charting of 11 studio albums, four compilation albums, one extended play (EP), four live albums, six video albums and 54 singles.

Vocalist/guitarist Chrissie Hynde, guitarist/keyboardist James Honeyman-Scott, bassist Pete Farndon and drummer Martin Chambers formed The Pretenders in 1978. Their chart-topping debut album, Pretenders, is widely regarded as one of the finest debut albums of all time. The Pretenders' hit songs include "Brass in Pocket" (1979), "Talk of the Town" (1980), "Message of Love" (1981), "Back on the Chain Gang" (1982), "Middle of the Road" (1983), "2000 Miles" (1984), "Don't Get Me Wrong" (1986), "My Baby" (1986), and "I'll Stand by You" (1994).

Albums

Studio albums

Notes;
 Break Up the Concrete was released in Europe only as a double-disc with The Best of Pretenders.

Live albums

Compilation albums

Notes;
 The Best of Pretenders was released as a double disc with Break Up the Concrete in Europe and Brazil in June 2009, titled The Best of / Break Up the Concrete.

Extended plays

Singles

Notes;
 In 1980, "What You Gonna Do About It" (A-side) was released as a single with "Stop Your Sobbing (original demo version)" as the B-side as a special flexipop single in the UK.
 The 1987 "If There Was a Man" UK release was accredited to The Pretenders for 007
 In 1980, "Precious" (A-side) was released as a single in Spain with "Stop Your Sobbing" as the B-side.
 In 1980, "Cuban Slide" (A-side) was released as a single in Japan, backed with "Stop Your Sobbing" as the B-side.
 In 1982 "I Go to Sleep" (A-side) was released in Belgium with "English Roses" (album track) as the B-side.
 In 1987, neither of the two tracks of the promotional single "Kid (Remix) b/w "Stop Your Sobbing (Demo Version)" actually appear on the album in those versions; rather they appear as the original single versions.
 The Pretenders also appear on the UK Singles Chart for their appearance on the 1997 Fever Pitch The EP for which their cover of "Goin' Back" is listed. The EP charted at No. 65 for one week on 10 May 1997.
 The column for US Adult chart positions consists of peak positions from Billboards Adult Contemporary chart for "Don't Get Me Wrong", "I'll Stand by You" and "Loving You Is All I Know", Billboards Adult Top 40 chart for "Human" and Adult album alternative (AAA) for "Boots of Chinese Plastic" and "Love's a Mystery". In addition, "I'll Stand by You" also charted on Adult Top 40 chart, but its peak position (#23) was lower than on the Adult Contemporary chart.

Other appearances

DVDs
The Isle of View (1995)
Loose in L.A. (2003)
20 Years Ago Today – Live Aid (2005)
Live in London (2010)
Pretenders and Friends (2019)

References

Rock music group discographies
New wave discographies
Discographies of American artists
Discographies of British artists
Discography